Táborský is a surname. Notable people with the surname include:

 Ivo Táborský (born 1985), Czech footballer
 Miroslav Táborský (born 1959), Czech actor
 Vladimír Táborský (born 1944), retired Czech football player and coach

Czech-language surnames